Bianca Wood (born 20 February 2000) is a field hockey player from South Africa.

Personal life
Wood attended Clarendon High School for Girls, East London.

Career

Under–21
Wood made her debut for the South Africa U–21 in 2022 at the FIH Junior World Cup in Potchefstroom.

National team
Wood made her senior international debut for South Africa in 2019, during a test series against Namibia in Randburg. In May 2022, she was named in the squad for the FIH World Cup in Terrassa and Amsterdam. Shortly after this announcement, she was also named in the squad for the Commonwealth Games in Birmingham.

Awards
2019 PHL Women - Young Player of the Tournament

References

External links

2000 births
Living people
Female field hockey forwards
South African female field hockey players
Sportspeople from East London, Eastern Cape
Alumni of Clarendon High School for Girls
Field hockey players at the 2022 Commonwealth Games